Marymount College may refer to:

 Marymount College, Gold Coast, a Roman Catholic school located in Gold Coast, Queensland, Australia
 Marymount College, Adelaide, a Roman Catholic school located in Adelaide, South Australia, Australia
 Any of the Marymount colleges formed by the Religious of the Sacred Heart of Mary (RSHM) from 1907 to 1962, including:
 Marymount Manhattan College, New York City, New York
 Marymount College, Tarrytown, New York, subsequently a Fordham University graduate campus; now closed
 Marymount California University (part of the curriculum merged with Loyola University of Los Angeles in 1973 to form Loyola Marymount University)
 Marymount University, Arlington, Virginia; formerly Marymount College
 Lynn University, Boca Raton, Florida; formerly Marymount College
 Marymount College (Kansas), Salina, Kansas; now closed
 Marymount Academy (Sudbury), Ontario, Canada; formerly Marymount College

See also
 Marymount University
 Marymount (disambiguation)